Găina River may refer to the following rivers in Romania:

 Găina, a tributary of the Cârlibaba in Suceava County
 Găina, a tributary of the Priboiasa in Vâlcea County

See also 
 Gaina (disambiguation)